MS&T may refer to:
MS&T (magazine), an international defence simulation and training publication
Missouri University of Science and Technology